Åke Gilbert Jansson (also known as Åke Spångert; 3 March 1916 – 14 September 1998) was a Swedish long-distance runner. He competed in the men's 5000 metres at the 1936 Summer Olympics.

References

External links

1916 births
1998 deaths
Athletes (track and field) at the 1936 Summer Olympics
Swedish male long-distance runners
Olympic athletes of Sweden
20th-century Swedish people